Fruit Cove is a census-designated place (CDP) in St. Johns County, Florida, United States. The population was 16,077 at the 2000 census. It is located in the community of St. Johns.

Geography
Fruit Cove is located at  (30.101153, -81.618318).

Fruit Cove is the location of the Marywood Retreat Center for the Diocese of St. Augustine.

Demographics

At the 2000 census there were 16,077 people, 5,294 households, and 4,600 families in the CDP. The racial makeup of the CDP was 94.76% White, 2.06% Black, 0.18% Native American, 1.61% Asian, 0.14% Pacific Islander, 0.44% from other races, and 0.81% from two or more races. Hispanic or Latino of any race were 2.38%.

The average household size was 3.02 and the average family size was 3.26.

The age distribution was 32.3% under the age of 18, 4.3% from 18 to 24, 31.8% from 25 to 44, 23.9% from 45 to 64, and 7.7% 65 or older.  The median age was 37 years. For every 100 females, there were 100.4 males.  For every 100 females age 18 and over, there were 94.5 males.

The median household income was $82,159 and the median family income  was $84,791. Males had a median income of $62,470 versus $35,775 for females. The per capita income for the CDP was $30,462.  About 1.6% of families and 1.9% of the population were below the poverty line, including 2.0% of those under age 18 and 1.7% of those age 65 or over.

Education
St. Johns County School District is the school district of the area.

The following elementary schools serve portions: Cunningham Creek, Durbin Creek, Freedom Crossing, Hickory Creek, and Julington Creek.

Three middle schools serve portions: Freedom Crossing, Fruit Cove, and Switzerland Point.

Two high schools serve portions: Bartram Trail High School and Creekside High School.

St Johns County Public Library System operates the Bartram Trail Branch.

References

Census-designated places in St. Johns County, Florida
Census-designated places in the Jacksonville metropolitan area
Census-designated places in Florida
Populated places on the St. Johns River